Solar power in Mississippi was an underutilized generation method, but an ongoing fast increase started in 2016. While the state had only 1.1 MW of grid-connected photovolatic capacity in 2015, there were 242.32 MW in 2019. Rooftop photovoltaics could provide 31.2% of all electricity used in Mississippi from 11,700 MW if solar panels were installed on every available roof.

In 2011, the Sierra Club sued the United States Department of Energy which was providing investment in a coal gasification plant being built by Mississippi Power. In 2012 Mississippi Power had only 0.05% renewables in its power mix. In a settlement in 2014, Mississippi Power agreed to allow net metering, and to offer 100 MW of wind or solar power purchase agreements. Mississippi is one of only two states, along with Florida, to have no potential for standard commercial wind power, having no locations that would provide at least 30% capacity factor, although 30,000 MW of 100 meter high turbines would operate at 25% capacity factor.

Georgia Power which provides energy in southeast Mississippi has started a program to contract for 210 MW of solar power in 2014, possibly increasing to 525 MW. 100 MW would be from small scale distributed installations.

Offering net metering is required by federal law, but Mississippi is one of only four states to not have adopted a statewide policy on net metering, which means it needs to be negotiated with the utility.

Statistics

Installations
 Four megawatts at Naval Construction Battalion Center in Gulfport by Hannah Solar, Mississippi Power's developer.

See also

Solar power in the United States
Renewable energy in the United States

References

External links
 Incentives and Policies

Energy in Mississippi
Mississippi